Sandman and The Sandman, in comics, may refer to a number of characters:

 Sandman (DC Comics), denoting the various characters that have taken the mantle of the Sandman, including:
 The Sandman (comic book), a comic book series written by Neil Gaiman and centers on the protagonist, Dream/Morpheus, the immortal anthropomorphic personification of dreams
 Sandman (Wesley Dodds), a comic character from the 1930s who has made more recent appearances in:
 Sandman Mystery Theatre
 Sandman Midnight Theatre, in which Dodds meets Dream
 Just Imagine... Sandman, Stan Lee and Walt Simonson’s version of Sandman
 Sandy Hawkins, the current DC Sandman
 Sandman (DC Comics) #Garrett Sanford, a comic book series from the 1970s, created by Joe Simon and Jack Kirby.
 The Sandman Saga (Superman), a Superman story arc published in 1971.

 Sandman (Marvel Comics), a supervillain who can transform his body into sand, and is an enemy of Spider-Man

See also
 Sandman (disambiguation)